Pioneer Point is a house and surrounding 45-acre estate near Centreville, Maryland, on Maryland's Eastern Shore owned by the Government of Russia as a recreational place for its diplomatic staff in the United States. The estate lies on a peninsula formed by the confluence of the Corsica and Chester rivers.

Pioneer Point is the former estate of wealthy business executive, and builder John J. Raskob who is best known for building the Empire State Building in New York City. Raskob constructed the 19 room mansion originally known as "Hartefeld Hall" after purchasing a 1600-acre tract of land on the Eastern Shore in 1925. Raskob later built another large house nearby to accommodate his 13 children.

After Raskob's death in 1950 the estate was subdivided and the mansion changed hands several times. The property was bought by the Soviet government in 1972, with subsequent Soviet additions to the property being funded by granting two properties in Moscow to the United States State Department. Pioneer Point was bought by the Russian Federation for $3 million in the aftermath of the collapse of the Soviet Union. It was likened to a dacha by Yuri Ushakov, the Russian ambassador to the United States in 2007.

Pioneer Point was treated as state property of the Russian Federation and activities there were protected under diplomatic immunity. On December 29, 2016, Russian access to the site was commuted in the wake of the alleged Russian involvement in the 2016 United States presidential election as part of a number of sanctions taken by the United States against Russian diplomatic personnel. President Barack Obama, in announcing the sanctions, stated that Pioneer Point and another compound in New York were "used by Russian personnel for intelligence-related purposes."

On May 31, 2017, six months after the sanctions, The Washington Post reported that President Donald Trump and his administration had decided to return Pioneer Point back to the Russians.

References

Houses in Queen Anne's County, Maryland
Soviet Union–United States relations
Russia–United States relations
Russian ambassadorial residences